The 1984 New Zealand rugby union tour of Fiji  was a series of four rugby union matches played by the New Zealand national rugby union team (the All Blacks) in Fiji in October 1984. The All Blacks won all four games, including the international match against the Fiji national rugby union team which New Zealand did not consider a full international match.

Matches
Scores and results list New Zealand's points tally first.

Touring party

Manager: 
Assistant Manager (coach): 
Captain: Jock Hobbs

Backs

Forwards

References

New Zealand
Fiji tour
Rugby union tours of Fiji
New Zealand national rugby union team tours
1984 in Fijian rugby union